John Mazmanian (May 18, 1926 – July 21, 2006), also known as Big John Mazmanian, was an American NHRA drag racer.

References 

1926 births
2006 deaths
Sportspeople from Los Angeles County, California
Dragster drivers
American people of Armenian descent
Racing drivers from California
Racing drivers from Los Angeles
People from East Los Angeles, California